Ancylosis harmoniella is a species of snout moth in the genus Ancylosis. It was described by Émile Louis Ragonot, in 1887 from Spain, Malta, Turkey, Algeria, Morocco, Tunisia, Libya, Egypt, Saudi Arabia, the Palestinian Territories, Syria, Iraq, Iran, Afghanistan and Transcaucasia.

The wingspan is about 18 mm.

References

Moths described in 1887
harmoniella
Moths of Europe
Moths of Africa
Moths of Asia